Kolašinac is a surname, a demonym for people from Kolašin, a town in northern Montenegro; it is derived from family ancestors who adopted it after leaving the town. It is borne by Bosniaks.

Asmir Kolašinac (born 1984), Serbian shot putter of Bosniak origin
Sead Kolašinac (born 1993), Bosnian footballer

Bosnian surnames
Toponymic surnames